Kárahnjúkar Hydropower Plant, officially called Fljótsdalur Power Station is a hydroelectric power plant in Fljótsdalshérað municipality in eastern Iceland, designed to produce  annually for Alcoa's Fjarðaál aluminum smelter  to the east in Reyðarfjörður. The project, named after the nearby Kárahnjúkar mountains, involves damming the rivers Jökulsá á Dal and Jökulsá í Fljótsdal with five dams, creating three reservoirs. Water from the reservoirs is diverted through  of underground water tunnels and down a  vertical penstock towards a single underground power station. The smelter became fully operational in 2008 and the hydropower project was completed in 2009.

The project has been heavily criticised for its environmental impact and its use of foreign workers.

Description 
The hydroelectricity project harnesses the rivers Jökulsá á Dal and Jökulsá í Fljótsdal by creating three reservoirs with five concrete-face rock-filled embankment dams; three on the Jökulsá á Dal and two on the Jökulsá í Fljótsdal. After being used in the Fljótsdalur Power Station, all water used in electricity production is discharged into the river Jökulsá í Fljótsdal.

Three dams on the Jökulsá á Dal; the Kárahnjúkar Dam, the Desjará Dam and the Sauðárdalur Dam create the Hálslón Reservoir.

Before each of the headrace tunnels from the Hálslón Reservoir or Ufsarlón Reservoir reach the underground power station, they both join to form a single combined headrace tunnel. The underground Fljótsdalur Power Station contains six vertical-axis Francis turbine generators rated at 115 MW each. The power production of 4,600 GWh/year corresponds to a capacity factor of 76%, which is relatively high for a hydroelectric facility. Power produced is then transmitted to Alcoa's Fjarðaál aluminium smelter  to the east in Reyðarfjörður.

Fjarðaál aluminium smelter 

The Fjarðaál aluminium smelter was completed June 2007 and reached full operation in April 2008. Construction began in 2004 and the facility contains a smelter, cast house, rod production and deep-water port. The smelter employs 450 people and produces 940 tons of aluminium a day, with capacity of 346,000 metric tons of aluminium per year. Fjarðaál means "Fjords Aluminium" in Icelandic.

History 
Using the rivers Jökulsá á Dal and Jökulsá í Fljótsdal along with other resources in eastern Iceland has been on the drawing board since the 1970s. From 1975 to 2002, several international companies had planned or attempted to build a metal plant at Reyðarfjörður that would be powered by a hydroelectricity project similar to the Kárahnjúkar. All failed because of opposition to the project until Alcoa along with the Government of Iceland and Landsvirkjun, Iceland's national power company committed to the massive project in 2002.

Construction 

The project is funded by Landsvirkjun, which operates the dams and Fljótsdalur Power Station. The Italian company Impregilo is the largest contractor working on the dams. The total cost of the hydropower project is 1.3 billion USD. The penstock was built in place by the German company DSD-NOELL (Würzburg) whereas ATB Riva Calzoni of Italy provided intake structures, wheels gates and sliding gates. In total, more than 4,000 tons of steel were used for the steel liner.

Preparatory work on the project began in August 2002 and construction on the Kárahnjúkar Dam and headrace tunnels for the Hálslón Reservoir began in April 2003. In September of the same year, construction began on the underground power station. Construction on both the Desjará Dam and the Sauðárdalur Dam began in April 2004. In June 2006, construction of the Kelduá Dam and Ufsarstífla Dam began and in September, the Hálslón Reservoir began to fill. In mid-2008, the Kelduá and Ufsarstífla Dams were complete and the Ufsarlón Reservoir headrace tunnel was ready.

Construction on the headrace tunnels was done by three full-face tunnel boring machines, while remaining areas were drilled and blasted. This was the first time that tunnel boring machines were used in Iceland.

There were several workplace fatalities during the construction process including: Arni Thor Bjarnason, Eilifur Gopi Hammond, Ludvik Alfred Halldorsson and Kresimir Durinic.

Criticism 
The dams have been the frequent subject of protests by environmentalists for many reasons. About 70% of the workforce was composed of foreign workers. For the construction of Kárahnjúkar Hydropower Plant in East Iceland, five dams in two glacial rivers created three reservoirs, that together flooded over 440,000 acres of unspoilt Highland territory. The megastructure is on a scale like nothing the nation has seen before or since and, as such, has been a constant source of protest and controversy due to the landscapes irretrievably lost. The total affected area according to the environmental impact assessment, outlines that a total of 3,000 km2 or 741,316 acres were affected by the project's construction. That is approximately 3% of Iceland's total land mass.

Representation in film and literature 
The project as a whole was criticised heavily in the 2006 book Draumalandið and subsequent 2009 documentary Dreamland. The project was documented in a MegaStructures program of the National Geographic Channel, and the Discovery Channel's Extreme Engineering, along with mention in the 2006 Sigur Rós rockumentary Heima (At Home), where the band played at a protest against the building of the dam. The dam has been read as an inspiration for a mysterious dam in Steinar Bragi's horror novel Hálendið.

See also 

 Economy of Iceland
 Renewable energy in Iceland
 Hydroelectricity in Iceland

References

External links 

 Kárahnjúkar HEP Overview – Landsvirkjun – September 2009
 Anti-dam website
 Kárahnjúkar – 2005 – picture gallery from islandsmyndir.is
 Kárahnjúkar – 2006 – picture gallery from islandsmyndir.is
 Kárahnjúkar – 2007 A – picture gallery from islandsmyndir.is
 Kárahnjúkar – 2007 B – picture gallery from islandsmyndir.is
 Kárahnjúkar – 2008 – picture gallery from islandsmyndir.is
 Kárahnjúkar – Hringiða, 2011 – picture gallery from islandsmyndir.is
 Kárahnjúkar – Dams, 2011 – picture gallery from islandsmyndir.is

Energy infrastructure completed in 2009
Hydroelectric power stations in Iceland
Alcoa
Underground power stations
Eastern Region (Iceland)